Tera Yaar Hoon Main ( I am your friend) is an Indian Hindi-language comedy-drama television series, produced by Shashi Mittal and Sumeet Hukamchand Mittal under the banner Shashi Sumeet Productions, starring Sudeep Sahir, Sayantani Ghosh, and Ansh Sinha. It premiered on Sony SAB from 31 August 2020 to 29 January 2022.

Plot

Rajeev Bansal, a simpleton bank manager, lives in Jaipur with his loving and caring family consisting of his wife Jhanvi, children Trishala and Rishabh, parents Pratap and Sushma, brother Rajan, sister-in-law Ruchi, and nephew Varun. Rishabh is a moody and spirited teenager who shares a close bond with his mother but doesn't share the same rapport with his father. Rajeev desires to erase the age gap between him and his son and become a close friend and confidant to him. Rishabh finds his father's efforts childish, but an adamant Rajeev eventually succeeds.

Once, Rajeev and Jhanvi were talking on the phone while the latter is driving. Because of this, Jhanvi didn't see a pedestrian in front of her car and immediately turned her car as she noticed him. The pedestrian survived, but Jhanvi accidentally hit another car, resulting in both her and the driver of the other car's deaths.

One year later  
Rajeev has lost interest in his life due to Jhanvi's death. A new Punjabi senior manager named Daljeet Bagga who had lost her husband, Ravinder, in a car accident, joins his bank. Rajeev makes a terrible first impression on Daljeet while welcoming her. As Daljeet humiliates him in front of everyone, they take a disliking to each other. Rajeev sympathizes with her as it is revealed that Shakti, Ravinder's selfish and evil younger brother, is trying to gain custody of Daljeet's children Balwinder "Barry" and Twinkle since they are the heirs to Ravinder's property. Rajeev learns that Daljeet's husband was the other person who died in Jhanvi's accident. Shocked and guilt-ridden, he marries Daljeet to protect her children. She wins Barry and Twinkle's custody but Rajeev's family opposes Rajeev and Daljeet's relationship, unaware that their marriage is only a fake contract. Rishabh and Barry become great rivals. Shakti repeatedly attempts to separate Rajeev and Daljeet but fails. Daljeet eventually makes a place for herself in the Bansal family and is accepted by everyone except Rajeev's children.

Barry initially hated Rajeev and cared about Shakti, but Shakti's true colors are revealed. Barry then starts liking Rajeev and later accepts him as his father to Rishabh's dismay. Rishabh refuses to see Daljeet as his mother and hates her as he believes that she is trying to replace Jhanvi and snatch his father from him. Daljeet stands up for Trishala against Rajeev and supports her despite facing humiliation, so Trishala realizes Daljeet's love for her and accepts her as her mother.

Daljeet falls in love with Rajeev and eventually confesses her love to Rajeev who continues living by Jhanvi's memories and thus refuses to accept Daljeet's feelings. Daljeet feels heartbroken but hides the pain. Shortly thereafter, Shakti exposes the contractual basis of Rajeev and Daljeet's marriage to their family which shocks them, but they remain supportive. Shakti again tries to gain custody of Barry and Twinkle, but his true intentions are exposed by Rajeev. Daljeet wins the case but her marriage with Rajeev is annulled. Both of them are disheartened by the annulment, with Rajeev unexpectedly falling in love with her but not realizing his feelings. Rishabh plots to humiliate Daljeet by spiking her drink at a party but repents when she discovers his plans but still defends him. Rishabh eventually accepts her as his mother.

Daljeet finds out that Jhanvi was responsible for her husband's death. Betrayed, she refuses to forgive Rajeev for hiding this and ignores his sincere attempts to apologize. Meanwhile, Rishabh is bullied by seniors at college. Barry defends him and thrashes the seniors along with Rishabh. Barry and Rishabh develop a mutual understanding and finally become friends. In a twist of events, Daljeet is in an accident planned by Shakti for revenge. Shakti tries to kill Daljeet in the hospital by cutting her oxygen supply. A devastated Rajeev rushes to the hospital, hugs Daljeet, and bursts into tears. Miraculously, she opens her eyes and later makes a full recovery. The fear of losing Daljeet makes Rajeev realize his love for her. Daljeet forgives Rajeev after witnessing his repentance and learning about how he cared for her in the hospital. Rajeev musters up the courage and confesses his love to Daljeet, who is overjoyed as she hugs him and accepts his heartfelt proposal. Though they encounter several obstacles, they eventually get married in a grand ceremony.

Barry suffers a severe head injury in a fight with Rishabh and loses his memory of the previous year, including Rajeev and Daljeet's marriage. He becomes the angry young man he was a year ago and starts disliking Rajeev again because of his closeness to Daljeet, which forces Rajeev and Daljeet to hide that their marriage. Rajeev learns the truth behind Barry's accident and cuts all ties with Rishabh but is eventually convinced by Daljeet to forgive him after he witnesses Rishabh's care towards Barry and his repentance towards his mistake. Meanwhile, Shakti returns and forces Daljeet to give him all her properties by threatening to reveal to Barry her marriage with Rajeev. However, Barry catches Shakti forcing a helpless Daljeet and furiously tears the property papers, making a humiliated Shakti leave.

Ravinder, Daljeet's husband who was thought to be dead, turns out to be alive and returns for Daljeet. Heartbroken that Daljeet has remarried, Ravinder decides to leave forever for her happiness, but his identity is accidentally revealed. Ravinder restores Barry's memories of the previous year and Rajeev and Daljeet's marriage by recreating a past situation, after which Rishabh and Barry reconcile. As a shocked Daljeet finds herself having to choose between Rajeev and Ravinder, an equally shocked Rajeev consoles her and promises to accept her decision no matter who she chooses. Ravinder, who fears losing Daljeet and is manipulated by Shakti, plots to get her back. Rajeev is shocked when he learns about Ravinder's selfish motives but doesn't expose him. Rajeev further sacrifices his love for Daljeet and tries to make her choose Ravinder by faking a critical illness, but Daljeet eventually learns the truth. Enraged, she confronts Rajeev and confesses that she would die without him, and they embrace. Ravinder realizes his mistake and apologizes to Rajeev. Shakti, infuriated that his plan failed, shoots at Rajeev, but Ravinder gets shot while saving him. Ravinder shoots Shakti in retaliation and kills him. Before dying himself, Ravinder asks Rajeev to take care of Daljeet.

Six months later 
Rajeev and Daljeet are celebrating their first wedding anniversary. Rajeev romantically proposes to Daljeet, making her blush as everyone cheers for the happy couple. Rishabh, now in his first year of IIT, sets out to shape his future with everyone's blessings and best wishes. As Rishabh informs them that he is running late, Rajeev drops him off at the train station on his scooter, not as a father but as a supportive friend, concluding the series.

Cast

Main
Sudeep Sahir as Rajeev "Titu" Bansal − Pratap and Sushma's elder son; Reena and Rajan's brother; Jhanvi's widower; Daljeet's second husband; Trishala and Rishab's father; Barry and Twinkle's step-father. Rajeev wanted to befriend Rishabh. He married Daljeet only to help her get her children's custody and sanctify Jhanvi's mistake but eventually falls in love with her. He is a simpleton and bank manager and is a junior to Daljeet. He is perplexed by Daljeet's reckless and weird ideas but appreciates them when they succeed. He is irritated when Daljeet misinterprets him or bickers with him for small issues but loves her nonetheless. (2020–2022)
Sayantani Ghosh as Daljeet Kaur Bansal − Gurmeet's daughter; Ravinder's widow; Rajeev's second wife; Barry and Twinkle's mother; Rishabh and Trishala's step-mother. She married Rajeev only to protect her children but eventually fell in love with him. She is an independent and empowered woman and is a senior to Rajeev at the bank. She is a Punjabi and uses light Punjabi while speaking and frequently says "Oh Babaji!" (Oh God!). She bickers with Rajeev over small issues but loves him a lot. (2020–2022)
 Ansh Sinha as Rishabh "Rishu" Bansal − Rajeev's and Jhanvi's son; Daljeet's step-son; Trishala's brother; Barry and Twinkle's former rival turned brother; Swapnil and Varun's cousin; Gargi's boyfriend. He is an energetic, spirited, and moody teenager who initially hesitated to befriend his father but later became more of a supportive friend than a son to Rajeev. He initially hated Daljeet and was at loggerheads with Barry but is now Barry's good friend. He later starts liking Daljeet also and eventually accepts her as his mother. He loves his family immensely. (2020–2022)

Recurring 
 Rajendra Chawla as Pratap Bansal − Sushma's husband; Reena, Rajeev and Rajan's father; Swapnil, Trishala, Rishabh and Varun's grandfather; Barry and Twinkle's step-grandfather. He is a strict disciplinarian. He is passionate about cricket and claims to have scored a double century once using his special cricket bat. He shares a bond with Twinkle. (2020–2022)
 Jaya Ojha as Sushma Bansal − Pratap's wife; Reena, Rajeev and Rajan's mother; Swapnil, Trishala, Rishabh and Varun's grandmother; Barry and Twinkle's step-grandmother. She went into a shock after Jhanvi's death and was confined to a wheelchair. However, Daljeet helped her recover from this after which she started accepting Daljeet. (2020–2022)
 Neeharika Roy as Trishala "Trishu" Bansal − Rajeev and Jhanvi's daughter; Daljeet's step-daughter; Rishabh's sister; Barry and Twinkle's sister-figure; Swapnil and Varun's cousin; Laksh's ex-fiancée. She was shirker and fashionable but became caring and responsible after Jhanvi's death. Her catchphrase is "Just because I'm a girl?". She initially hated Daljeet but accepted her as her mother after realizing Daljeet's love for her, when she supported her relationship with Laksh. However, she later broke up with Laksh due to his possessive and distrustful nature and was supported in this decision by Rajeev and Daljeet. (2020–2022)
Viraj Kapoor as Balwinder "Barry" Bagga − Daljeet and Ravinder's elder son; Rajeev's step-son; Twinkle's brother; Rishabh and Trishala's former rival turned brother-figure; Swapnil and Varun's step-cousin. He is a martial arts champion and has a blue belt in karate. He is a hothead and often breaks things in anger, due to which Pratap occasionally calls him 'Krodh ka Jwalamukhi'. He initially hated Rajeev but later accepts him as his father. (2020–2022)
Ekagra Dwivedi as Twinkle Bagga − Daljeet and Ravinder's younger son; Rajeev's step-son; Barry's brother; Trishala and Rishabh's brother-figure; Swapnil and Varun's step-cousin. He often loosens nuts and bolts using his toolkit. His catchphrase is "Ek Gal Puccha?" (May I ask a question?). He is cute and chubby, so Pratap calls him 'Chhota Ganpati'. (2020–2022)
Ashu Sharma as Rajan "Nitu" Bansal − Pratap and Sushma's younger son; Reena and Rajeev's brother; Ruchi's husband; Varun's father. He owns a toy shop. He is childish and silly. He fears his father and never dares to cross him. (2020–2022)
 Vibhuti Patil Thakur as Ruchi Bansal − Rajan's wife; Varun's mother. She is kind-hearted but cooks tasteless food. She often says, "God is so kind!" when something good has happened. (2020–2022)
 Gautam Ahuja as Varun Bansal − Rajan and Ruchi's son; Swapnil, Trishala and Rishabh's cousin; Barry and Twinkle's step-cousin. He, like his father, sometimes acts silly. He speaks in poetic verses and often says "Yo!" (2020–2022)
 Shweta Gulati as Jhanvi Jaiswal Bansal − Mamta's sister; Rajeev's late wife; Trishala and Rishabh's mother. She was an ideal housewife and also ran an NGO. She died in a car accident. (2020) 
 Manu Malik / Sarwar Ahuja as Ravinder Bagga  − Shakti's brother; Daljeet's late husband; Barry and Twinkle's father. He was presumed dead in the car accident but is later revealed to be alive and he returns for Daljeet. He loves Daljeet and his children immensely. He dies in real while saving Rajeev from a bullet shot by Shakti. (2020)/(2022)
 Mohit Daga as Shakti Bagga − Ravinder's brother; Mamta's obsessive lover; Rajeev and Daljeet's rival. He is a greedy, wicked, and evil man and showed his true colors after his brother's death. He tried to gain custody of Daljeet's children to gain his brother's property which was now of Barry and Twinkle. He then tried to separate Rajeev and Daljeet but fails. He later changes but soon becomes a villain again. He tries to kill Rajeev by shooting a bullet at him but Ravinder takes that bullet and shoots Shakti in return, killing him. (2020–2022)
 Divya Bhatnagar as Reena "Tinki" Bansal Agarwal − Pratap and Sushma's daughter; Rajeev and Rajan's sister; Ashish's wife; Swapnil's mother (2020)
 Sukesh Anand as Ashish Kumar Agarwal − Reena's husband; Swapnil's father. He was a reputed member of 'Jaipur Nagar Nigam'. (2020)
 Meghan Jadhav as Swapnil Agarwal − Reena and Ashish's son; Trishala, Rishabh and Varun's cousin; Barry and Twinkle's step-cousin; Neelu's ex-fiancé. (2020)
 Priyal Gor as Mamta Jaiswal − Jhanvi's sister; Rajeev's former unrequited lover. She becomes pregnant through IVF with Shakti as her donor. She wanted Rajeev to be her donor to which Rajeev later agreed, but Shakti switched Rajeev's donor samples with his own. She tried to separate Rajeev and Daljeet due to her unrequited love for Rajeev but later realized her mistake. (2021)
 Tasneem Khan as Gargi Rathore − Kunti and Sadanand's daughter; Rishabh's girlfriend; Barry and Varun's friend. She was initially addicted to drugs and was a bad influence but changed after meeting Rishabh and his family. She later became Rishabh's girlfriend. (2021–2022)
 Prakash Ramchandani as Sadanand "Sadu" Dungriyal − Principal of Oak Leaf College; Kunti's ex-husband; Gargi's father. A misogynist who disrespects single mothers and thinks that they cannot raise their children properly. (2021–2022)
Sushma Murudkar as Kunti Rathore − Gargi's mother; Sadanand's ex-wife. She is an independent woman who divorced her husband as he controlled and abused her. (2021–2022)
Manish Mishraa as Bajrang Mishra − A worker in Rajeev and Daljeet's bank. His catchphrase is "Bajrangbali ki Kripa se" (By the Grace of Lord Hanuman). (2020–2022)
Sagar Parekh as Lakshya Roy − Shobha's son; Trishala's fiancé whose marriage was haulted by Rajeev after observing Lakshya’s over- possessiveness towards Trishala. (2021–2022)
Vaishnavi MacDonald as Shobha Roy − Lakshya's mother. (2021)
Vibha Chibber as Gurmeet Kaur − Daljeet's mother; Barry and Twinkle's grandmother. (2021-2022)
Sailesh Gulabani as Rahul − Mamta's ex-fiancé. (2021)
Gaurav Kumar as Shashank - Trishala's best friend. (2021)
Guneet Sharma as Hudda − A Haryanvi senior student at Oak Leaf College; a bully who harasses his juniors along with his gang. (2021)
 Nitin Chauhaan as Jimmy − Daljeet's childhood friend; a rich fitness enthusiast. He came into Daljeet's life once again and flirted with her which made Rajeev jealous. (2021)
 Nishi Saxena as Princess Amy − Barry's ex-crush (2021)
 Ankita Sahu as Chandni Agarwal − Rakesh's younger daughter; Neelu's sister; Rishabh and Varun's crush; Chikoo (Johnny)'s real owner. (2020)
 Ravi Gossain as Rakesh Kumar Agarwal − Neelu and Chandni's father. He is a con artist and is caught by the police with the help of his daughter Chandni and the Bansals. (2020)
 Ashwini Tobe as Neelu Agarwal − Rakesh's elder daughter; Chandni's sister; Swapnil's ex-fiancée. She and her father were caught by the police. (2020)
 Trupti Mishra as Nirjhara Gupta − Rishabh and Varun's best friend who had a crush on Rishabh. (2020)

Production

Development 
Set in Jaipur and filmed in Mumbai, the show is produced by Sumeet Mittal and Shashi Mittal under the banner Shashi Sumeet Productions.

The shooting of the show was indefinitely halted in April 2021 due to the COVID-19 Lockdown and the filming restrictions imposed in Maharashtra, and the remaining episodes were aired. After almost a fortnight, the production resumed with the show being filmed in Rajkot. The shooting restarted in Mumbai towards the end of June 2021.

Casting 
Sudeep Sahir and Ansh Sinha were finalized to portray the male lead Rajeev Bansal and his son Rishabh respectively in the show.

Initially, Ami Trivedi was cast as Jhanvi Bansal, the female lead (Rajeev's wife). However, Trivedi opted out due to the COVID-19 pandemic and thus Shweta Gulati was approached cast to portray Jhanvi.

After the death of Gulati's character, Sayantani Ghosh was brought in to portray Daljeet Bagga, the new female lead.

Release 
Sony SAB unveiled the show's first teaser in April 2020. On 25 July 2020, an official promo was unveiled which announced that the show would appear in August. Another promo was unveiled on 21 August 2020, announcing the release date.

The show went off-air on 29 January 2022 due to low TRP ratings, completing 378 episodes after a successful run of 2 years.

Crossover 
The Big Shanivaar: Crossover with Maddam Sir, wherein SHO Haseena Malik was hired to investigate the theft of Trishala's expensive necklace. (Episode 283, 9 Oct 2021)

Big Shanivaar: Crossover with Ziddi Dil Maane Na, wherein Koel (one of the supporting leads of Ziddi Dil Maane Na) was fleeing her abusive husband and coincidentally reached the Bansals' house, where Daljeet helped her escape. (Episode 319, 20 Nov 2021)

See also 

 List of programs broadcast by Sony SAB
 List of Hindi comedy shows

References

External links
 
 Tera Yaar Hoon Main on SonyLIV

Television shows set in Rajasthan
Television shows set in Jaipur
Sony SAB original programming
2020 Indian television series debuts
Indian comedy television series